The CWF Mid-Atlantic Heavyweight Championship was a professional wrestling heavyweight championship in Carolina Wrestling Federation Mid-Atlantic (CWF Mid-Atlantic).

Title history
Overall, there have been 38 reigns shared between 23 wrestlers, with two vacancy. The inaugural champion was David Taylor, who was awarded the title in 2000 to become the first CWF Heavyweight Champion. Ric Converse holds the record for most reigns, with six. At 1085 days, Trevor Lee's first reign is the longest in the title's history. Adrian Jackson's only reign was the shortest in the history of the title, lasting only seven days.

Reigns

Combined reigns

References
General

Specific

External links

CWF Mid-Atlantic Heavyweight Title at WrestlingData.com
CWF Mid-Atlantic Heavyweight Title at Cagematch.de

CWF Mid-Atlantic championships
Heavyweight wrestling championships
United States regional professional wrestling championships